The Museum of Fine Arts, Houston (MFAH), is an art museum located in the Houston Museum District of Houston, Texas. With the recent completion of an eight-year campus redevelopment project, including the opening of the Nancy and Rich Kinder Building in 2020, it is the 12th largest art museum in the world based on square feet of gallery space. The permanent collection of the museum spans more than 6,000 years of history with approximately 70,000 works from six continents.

Facilities

The museum's collections and programs are housed in nine facilities. The Susan and Fayez S. Sarofim Campus encompasses 14 acres including seven of the facilities, with two additional facilities, Bayou Bend and Rienzi (house museums) at off site locations. The main public collections and exhibitions are in the Law, Beck, and Kinder buildings.

The Susan and Fayez S. Sarofim Campus
 Caroline Wiess Law Building – the original neo-classical building was designed in phases by architect William Ward Watkin. The original Caroline Wiess Law building was constructed in 1924 and the east and west wing were added in 1926. The Robert Lee Blaffer Memorial Wing was designed by Kenneth Franzheim and opened to the public in 1953. The new construction included significant structural improvements to several existing galleries—most notably, air conditioning. Two subsequent additions, Cullinan Hall and the Brown Pavilion, designed by Ludwig Mies van der Rohe were built in 1958 and 1974 respectively. This section of the Museum of Fine Arts, Houston campus is the only Mies-designed museum in the United States. The Caroline Wiess Law building provides an ideal space in which to exhibit temporary and traveling exhibitions, as well as installations of Islamic art, Pacific Island and Australian art, Asian art, Indonesian gold artworks, and Mesoamerican and sub-Saharan African art. Of special interest is the Glassell Collection of African Gold, the largest assemblage of its kind in the world. Also the Nidhika and Pershant Mehta Arts of India, the only space in Houston for Indian Arts Culture.
 Audrey Jones Beck Building – Opened to the public in 2000, the Beck Building was designed by Rafael Moneo, a Pritzker Architecture Prize Laureate. The museum Trustees elected to name the building after Audrey Jones Beck in honor of the large collection she had donated to the museum several decades prior. In addition to traveling exhibitions and rotating temporary shows of photography, prints and drawings on the lower levels, the building displays the permanent collections of antiquities, European, and American art up to 1900, including the Impressionist.  
 Nancy and Rich Kinder Building – In 2012, the museum selected Steven Holl Architects to design a  expansion that primarily holds galleries for art after 1900. Opened to the public in November 2020, the new building occupies a two-acre site north of the Caroline Wiess Law Building. The new MFAH building is adjacent to Lillie and Hugh Roy Cullen Sculpture Garden and an expanded Glassell School of Art. In addition to a theater, restaurant, café, and seven small gardens and reflecting pools inset along the building's perimeter, the 237,213 square-foot Kinder building increases the museums overall exhibition space by nearly 75 percent. In 2021, The Bastion Collection opened Le Jardinier, a contemporary French restaurant emphasizing the highest-quality, seasonal ingredients from Michelin-starred chef Alain Verzeroli, and Italian-inspired Cafe Leonelli.
 The Lillie and Hugh Roy Cullen Sculpture Garden – was designed by US-born artist and landscape architect Isamu Noguchi and opened in 1986. The Lillie and Hugh Roy Cullen Sculpture Garden houses more than twenty-five works by artists from the nineteenth, twentieth, and twenty-first centuries from the MFAH and other major collections.
 Glassell School of Art – founded in 1979 and designed by architect S. I. Morris, the Glassell School of Art offers programs under the Studio School for Adults. The Glassell School of Art serves as the teaching wing of the MFAH, with a variety of classes, workshops, and educational opportunities for students diverse in age, interests, experience, and needs. In 2014, Steven Holl designed a new L-shaped building for the school, featuring a ramped amphitheatre that leads up to a walkable rooftop garden. In addition to opening onto Noguchi's sculpture garden and providing added outdoor space for programs and performances, the  building also sits atop an extensive underground parking garage. The school offers classes at the Studio School for Adults and the Glassell Junior School, as well as Community Bridge Programs, special programs for youths, and the Core Artist-in-Residence Program.
 Central Administration and Glassell Junior School of Art Building – The building, opened in 1994 and designed by Texan architectural designer Carlos Jimenez, houses the museum's administrative functions as well as the Glassell Junior School. The MFAH is the only museum facility in the United States that has a special building dedicated solely to art classes for children.
The Sarah Campbell Blaffer Foundation Center for Conservation – is a 37,864-square-foot  conservation center designed by Lake-Flato Architects that was completed in 2018. It is home to conservation labs and studios located above the museum's parking garage. It is not open to the public.

Other facilities
 Bayou Bend Collection and Gardens – features a collection of American decorative art and furniture. The Bayou Bend Collection and Gardens, former home of Life Trustee Ima Hogg, was designed by architect John F. Staub in 1927. Miss Hogg donated the property to the MFAH in 1957, followed, in 1962, by the donation of its collection of paintings, furniture, ceramics, glass, metals, and textiles. Bayou Bend was officially dedicated and opened to the public in 1966.
 Rienzi – the MFAH house museum for European decorative arts, Rienzi was donated to the MFAH by Carroll Sterling Masterson and Harris Masterson III in 1991. The structure was designed in 1952 by John F. Staub, the same architect who designed Bayou Bend. Completed in 1954, Rienzi served as both a family home and a center for Houston civic and philanthropic activity from the 1950s through the mid-1990s. After Mr. Masterson's death, the MFAH transformed the home into a museum and subsequently opened it to the public in 1999.

History

The Museum of Fine Arts, Houston (MFAH) is the oldest art museum in Texas. In 1917, the museum site was dedicated by the Houston Public School Art League (later the Houston Art League) with the intention of becoming a public art museum.  The first museum building was opened to the public in 1924.
The original building, designed by Houston architect William Ward Watkin in the Greek Neoclassical style, is the first art museum built in Texas. Today the MFAH encompasses three buildings, the Caroline Wiess Law, Audrey Jones Beck, and Nancy and Rich Kinder buildings, that house its primary collections and temporary exhibitions; two decorative arts house museums; The Glassell studio art school; a sculpture garden; a facility for conservation, storage and archives; and an administrative building with the Glassell Junior school of Art.

Prior to the opening of the permanent museum building in 1924, George M. Dickson bequeathed to the collection its first important American and European oil paintings. In the 1930s, Houstonian Annette Finnigan began her donation of antiquities and Texas philanthropist Ima Hogg gave her collection of avant-garde European prints and drawings. Ima Hogg's gift was followed by the subsequent donations of her Southwest Native American and Frederic Remington collections during the 1940s. The same decade witnessed the 1944 bequest of eighty-three Renaissance paintings, sculptures and works on paper from renowned New York collectors Edith and Percy Straus.
Over the next two decades, gifts from prominent Houston families and foundations concentrated on European art from the fifteenth to twentieth centuries, contemporary painting and sculpture, and African, Oceanic and Pre-Columbian art. Among these are the gifts of Life Trustees Sarah Campbell Blaffer, Dominique de Menil and Alice N. Hanzsen as well as that of the Samuel H. Kress Foundation. Augmented by museum purchases, the permanent collection numbered 12,000 objects by 1970.

The MFAH collection nearly doubled from 1970 to 1989, fueled by continued donations of art along with the advent of both accession endowment funding and corporate giving. In 1974, John and Audrey Jones Beck placed on long-term loan fifty Impressionist and Post-Impressionist masterpieces, augmenting the museum's already strong Impressionist collection. This collection would never leave the MFAH, formally entering its holdings in 1998 as a gift of Life Trustee Audrey Jones Beck. The collection is permanently displayed in the building that bears her name. On the heels of the Cullen Foundation's funding of the MFAH's first accessions endowment in 1970, the Brown Foundation, Inc., launched a challenge grant in 1976 that would stay in effect for twenty years raising funds for both accessions and operational costs in landmark amounts and providing incentive for additional community support. Also in 1976, the photography collection was established with Target Stores’ first corporate grant to the museum. Today the museum is the sixth-largest in the country.

In 2001, the MFAH, established the International Center for the Arts of the Americas (ICAA), the leading research institute for 20th-century Latin American and Latino art. The ICAA has been a pioneer in collecting, exhibiting and researching the diverse artistic production of Latin American and Latinx communities, including artists from Mexico, Central and South America, the Caribbean, and artists of Latin American descent living and working in the United States. Through the ICAA, the MFAH brought a long-term transformation in the appreciation and understanding of Latin American and Latinx visual arts in the United States and abroad.<ref="nytimes.com">Hilarie M. Sheets (November 13, 2020), '

Collection
With approximately 70,000 works of art, the largest part of the museum's collection lie in the areas of Italian Renaissance painting, French Impressionism, photography, American and European decorative arts, African and pre-Columbian gold, American art, and post-1945 European and American painting and sculpture. Other facets of the collection include African-American art and Texas painting. Emerging collection interests of modern and contemporary Latin American art, including the artwork of all Texas Latino artists, Asian art, and Islamic art continue to strengthen the museum's collection diversity. As a result of its encyclopedic collection, the museum ranks nationally among the top ten art museums in attendance.

Since 2019 Hossein Afshar Collection, one of the world's most distinguished private collections of Persian art, is on loan to MFAH. The museum has organised two exhibitions of this collection.

Claim for restitution 
In 2021 the Monuments Men Foundation announced that it had located a painting from the collection of Max Emden in the Museum of Fine Arts, Houston (MFAH). According to the foundation, the painting by Bernardo Bellotto, called The Marketplace at Pirna, had an inaccurate provenance that concealed the history of the painting.  After the MFAH refused to restitute the painting the Emden heirs filed a lawsuit in the Southern District of Texas.

The museum, which had rejected the Emden heirs’ claims since 2007, disagreed with the characterization of the painting as having been subject to a forced or duress sale due to Nazi persecution. MFAH director Gary Tinterow stated that Emden sold the painting voluntarily and, that after consulting provenance and legal experts, “we concluded that we had good title.” The museum also states that the Bellotto is one of multiple nearly identical versions by the artist, and was bought by Samuel H. Kress in 1952 and later donated to the museum in 1961.

Galleries
Arts of Africa, the Indigenous Pacific Islands, Australia, and the Americas [* = mixed media: ** = painted wood: *** = earthenware]

Arts of Asia and the Islamic Worlds

Antiquities

European and American painting (1400-1899) [all oil on canvas except: ** = tempera & gold leaf on panel; * = oil on panel]

Impressionism, postimpressionism, and early modern art [all oil on canvas unless noted otherwise]

Management
Philippe de Montebello directed the museum from 1969 to 1974. During the 28-year tenure of Peter Marzio between 1982 and 2010, the Museum of Fine Arts’ yearly attendance increased to roughly two million from 300,000; its operating budget climbed to $52 million from $5 million, and its endowment reached $1 billion (before the 2008 recession dropped its value to about $800 million). The museum's permanent collection more than tripled in size, to 63,000 works from 20,000. In 2010, Marzio was the sixth-highest-paid charity chief executive in the country, with compensation in 2008 of $1,054,939. A year after Peter Marzio died in 2010, Gary Tinterow was appointed as the museum's director. Mari Carmen Ramírez is a Puerto Rican Art curator and the Wortham Curator of Latin American Art at the Museum of Fine Arts, Houston.

See also

 Bayou Bend Collection and Gardens
 Ima Hogg
 Samuel Henry Kress
 List of most-visited museums in the United States
 List of claims for restitution for Nazi-looted art

Notes

External links
 
 Photographs from the Museum of Fine Arts, Houston, hosted by the Portal to Texas History.
 International Center for the Arts of the Americas at MFAH
Virtual tour of the Museum of Fine Arts, Houston provided by Google Arts & Culture

 
Art museums and galleries in Texas
Museums in Houston
Decorative arts museums in the United States
Ludwig Mies van der Rohe buildings
Rafael Moneo buildings
Modernist architecture in Texas
Art museums established in 1900
1900 establishments in Texas
Museums of American art
Asian art museums in the United States
Mesoamerican art museums in the United States
FRAME Museums
African art museums in the United States